Thomas Lenton Parr AM (11 September 1924 – 8 August 2003) was an Australian sculptor and teacher .

Sculptor
Born in East Coburg, Victoria, Lenton Parr spent eight years in the Royal Australian Air Force (Svc No. A33223) before enrolling to study sculpture at the Royal Melbourne Technical College (now RMIT University), then worked in England 1955–57 as an assistant to Henry Moore. There he was influenced by Reg Butler and Eduardo Paolozzi to work with enamelled steel structures, which was to become his lifelong specialty. After his return to Melbourne he showed at Peter Bray Gallery in 1957, and embarked on a career in art education.

Art educator 
Parr was Head of Sculpture at RMIT (1964–66), then Head of Prahran College of Technology in a $1.5 million building completed as he arrived. He appointed staff who became influential Australian art and was held in high esteem by staff, but his fine art philosophy clashed with the vocationally-oriented aims of the College Principal Alan Warren, who acted unsuccessfully to have him removed by advertising his job, prompting an inquiry by the Minister. Though his appointment at Prahran was upheld, he left, effective 31 January 1969, to take up the role of Principal at the National Gallery School (1969-1974), leading to his appointment as director (1974–84) of the Victorian College of the Arts when it replaced the Gallery School

Recognition
He was a member of the Victorian Sculptors' Society and its seventh president. Around 1960 he joined with Clifford Last, Inge King, Vincas Jomantas and Teisutis Zikaras to form a splinter group which exhibited together as the 'Centre Five'. In 1967 the group split from the Society, which never recovered from the departure of so many of its prominent members.

In 1977 he was invested with the Order of Australia for his services to sculpture and the arts. He was awarded Honorary Doctorate in Arts (RMIT University) in 1992. A major monograph on his work was published in 1999. The Lenton Parr Library (Lenton Parr Music, Visual and Performing Arts Library—formerly Victorian College of the Arts Library) of the University of Melbourne was named for him.

Selected exhibitions
 1956 Obelisk Gallery, London
 1957 Peter Bray Gallery, Melbourne
 1958 Victorian Sculptors Society
 1958 Gallery A, Melbourne
 1961 Mildura Art Gallery
 1961 Musee Rodin, Paris, 2nd Int'l Expo of Contemporary Sculpture 
 1962 Hungry Horse Gallery, Sydney
 1963 Sculpture Today, National Gallery of Victoria and Regional Galleries
 1963 Centre 5, Newcastle City Art Gallery, NSW 
 1964-65 Recent Australian Sculpture, Touring Australian State Galleries 
 1964 Centre 5, Hungry Horse Gallery, Sydney
 1966 Australian Sculpture Centre, Canberra 
 1968 Bonython Art Gallery, Sydney 
 1969 Bonython Art Gallery, Sydney 
 1973 Centre 5, Geelong Art Gallery, Victoria
 1973 Centre 5, McCelland Art Gallery, Victoria 
 1977 Ray Hughes Gallery, Brisbane 
 1978 Powell Street Gallery, Melbourne
 1981 Axiom Gallery, Melbourne
 1984-85 Lenton Parr Sculpture: Retrospective, National Gallery of Victoria 
 1987 Christine Abrahams Gallery, Melbourne
 1988-89 Manly Bicentennial Sculpture Commission 
 1990 Melbourne International Festival, Melbourne
 1990 Christine Abrahams Gallery, Melbourne 
 1990 Melbourne Sculptural Triennial, Melbourne 
 1990 A-Z Gallery, Tokyo 
 1992 Irving Galleries, Sydney 
 1993 Christine Abrahams Gallery, Melbourne 
 1995 Australia Felix, Benalla, Victoria 
 1996 A Sculpture Walk in the Royal Botanic Gardens, Melbourne
 1997 Christine Abrahams Gallery, Melbourne
 1998 The Mentors: Work by the 6 Deans of the Victorian College of the Arts School of Art, Victorian Arts Centre, Melbourne

Represented in collections
Represented in most State Gallery and other Public Collections and in various Institutional and Private Collections including: 
 Art Gallery of New South Wales
 Art Gallery of Western Australia 
 Australian National Gallery
 Australian National University 
 Ballarat College of Advanced Education	
 Carrick Hill, South Australia 
 Deakin University'
 Geelong Art Gallery 
 La Trobe University 
 McClelland Gallery, Langwarrin 
 Melbourne College of Advanced Education 
 Mildura Arts Centre
 National Gallery of Victoria
 Newcastle Region Art Gallery 
 Phillip Institute of Technology 
 Queensland Art Gallery 
 Queensland University of Technology 
 University of Melbourne 
 Victoria College
 Victorian College of the Arts 
 Warrnambool Art Gallery

Selected commissions
 1954 Melbourne Grammar School 
 1958 Union Theatre, University of Melbourne 
 1959 Chadstone Shopping Centre, Victoria 
 1960 Offices of Bernard Evans & Associates, Melbourne 
 1961 Telstro House, Queen Street, Melbourne
 1961 Chemistry Building, ANU, Canberra
 1962 Geology Building, ANU, Canberra
 1962 State Savings Bank, Showgrounds Branch, Melbourne
 1963 'Age' offices, Collins Street, Melbourne
 1964 Burwood Teachers' College, Burwood, Victoria
 1964 John Curtin Memorial Building, ANU, Canberra
 1965 General Motors - Holden, Fishermen's Bend, Melbourne
 1966 New Customs House, William Street, Melbourne
 1968 Philip Morris P/L, Moorabbin, Victoria
 1969 IAC Building, Exhibition Street, Melbourne
 1970 Technical Teachers' College, Malvern, Victoria
 1970 Astrojet Building, Tullamarine, Victoria
 1972 Private Commission, Hobart
 1972 State College of Victoria, Coburg
 1978 Australian Wool Corporation
 1981 Victorian College of Pharmacy
 1988 Elgee Park, Merricks, Victoria
 1988-89 Bicentennial Sculpture, The Corso, Manly, NSW	
 2001 Besen Collection, Tarrawarra Estate, Victoria

Bibliography
Sculpture, Longmans 1961
Vital Presences, Beagle Press 1999

References

2003 deaths
1924 births
20th-century Australian sculptors
Modern sculptors
Australian art teachers
Abstract sculptors
Artists from Melbourne
People from Coburg, Victoria
RMIT University alumni